Mirka Johanna Soinikoski (born 16 December 1975 in Helsinki) is a Finnish politician currently serving in the Parliament of Finland for the Green League at the Tavastia constituency.

Soinikoski is a medical specialist by education, graduating with a Licentiate in Medicine from the University of Turku in 2004. She specialised in Anesthesiology. Prior to entering parliament Soinikoski worked as a physician.

In 2021, during the Covid-19 pandemic, Soinikoski publicly supported the implementation of a Covid passport in Finland.

References

1975 births
Living people
Politicians from Helsinki
Green League politicians
Members of the Parliament of Finland (2019–23)
21st-century Finnish women politicians
Women members of the Parliament of Finland
Physicians from Helsinki
University of Turku alumni
21st-century Finnish physicians